Walter McGibbon Hay (born 1901) was a Scottish footballer who played as a right back, primarily for St Mirren. He played a part in the run to the Paisley club's Scottish Cup victory in 1926, but did not take part in the final, with Andrew Findlay preferred. Hay was an established part of the team by the time the Buddies reached another final in 1934, but this time they lost 5–0 to Rangers. The following season he signed for Rangers, but was only a reserve to the almost-ever present Dougie Gray and Whitey McDonald (1 league appearance) so was not entitled to a medal from their 1934–35 Scottish Division One title win, nor was he involved in their Scottish Cup final victory of that year, although he played for the Gers in the competition's First Round.

Hay was selected once for the Scottish Football League XI in 1932.

References

1901 births
Date of birth unknown
Year of death unknown
Scottish footballers
Footballers from Glasgow
People from Partick
Petershill F.C. players
King's Park F.C. players
St Mirren F.C. players
Rangers F.C. players
Scottish Junior Football Association players
Scottish Football League players
Association football defenders
Scottish Football League representative players